The Very Best of The Smiths is a compilation album by English rock band The Smiths. It was released in June 2001 by WEA in Europe, without consent or input from the band. It reached number 30 on the UK Albums Chart. The album was not released in the United States.

About the album
After Singles (1995), the previous Smiths compilation album that WEA (now the Warner Music Group) had issued, went out of print in Europe, Australia and Taiwan, the record company decided to revamp the package slightly and release it under the name The Very Best of The Smiths. WEA scrambled the running order and added five tracks, and enticed the record buyers with the incentive of digital remastering.

The album was widely criticised by the British music press, who, after stopping to praise the actual music, went on to condemn what they saw as a money grabbing exercise. They were quickly joined by singer Morrissey and guitarist Johnny Marr, who distanced themselves from the album, stating they had had no input whatsoever and that it should be ignored by fans. Both ridiculed the cover design and Marr additionally denounced the sound quality.

In the tradition of other Smiths compilations which largely overlapped except for a few songs, this album does contain two versions not available on any other of The Smiths' albums: the single mix of "Ask" and the 7-inch edit of "Last Night I Dreamt That Somebody Loved Me". The Singles compilation used the album versions of these songs.

Cover
The sleeve for The Very Best of The Smiths features Charles Hawtrey of Carry On fame, one of Morrissey's favourite actors (he wrote an obituary of him in the NME). The band members had no say in the cover, which has been described as "an adman's approximation of a Smiths cover" by Mojo magazine.

Track listing
All songs written by Morrissey/Marr. Songs marked "*" are exclusive to this compilation.

"Panic" – 2:20
"The Boy with the Thorn in His Side" (single version) – 3:17
"Heaven Knows I'm Miserable Now" – 3:35
"Ask" (single version)* – 3:09
"Bigmouth Strikes Again" – 3:13
"How Soon Is Now?" (album version) – 6:45
"This Charming Man" – 2:42
"What Difference Does It Make?" – 3:51
"William, It Was Really Nothing" – 2:12
"Some Girls Are Bigger Than Others" – 3:17
"Girlfriend in a Coma" – 2:02
"Hand in Glove" (album version) – 3:24
"There Is a Light That Never Goes Out" – 4:04
"Please, Please, Please, Let Me Get What I Want" – 1:53
"That Joke Isn't Funny Anymore" (album version) – 4:59
"I Know It's Over" – 5:49
"Sheila Take a Bow" – 2:41
"I Started Something I Couldn't Finish" – 3:47
"Still Ill" – 3:22
"Shakespeare's Sister" – 2:09
"Shoplifters of the World Unite" – 2:58
"Last Night I Dreamt That Somebody Loved Me" (single version)* – 3:10
"Stop Me If You Think You've Heard This One Before" – 3:33

 Tracks 7, 8, 12 and 19 – The Smiths
 Tracks 3, 6, 9 and 14 – Hatful of Hollow
 Tracks 6 and 15 – Meat Is Murder
 Tracks 5, 10, 13 and 16 – The Queen Is Dead
 Tracks 1, 3, 4, 14, 17, 20 and 21 – Louder Than Bombs
 Tracks 1, 2, 3, 9, 14, 17, 20 and 21 – The World Won't Listen
 Tracks 11, 18 and 23 – Strangeways, Here We Come

Personnel
 Morrissey – vocals
 Johnny Marr – guitars, keyboard instruments, harmonica, mandolins, synthesized saxophone, string and flute arrangements
 Andy Rourke – bass guitar, cello on "Shakespeare's Sister"
 Mike Joyce – drums

Additional musicians

 Craig Gannon – rhythm guitar on "Panic" and "Ask"
 Kirsty MacColl – backing vocals on "Ask"
 John Porter – slide guitar on "Sheila Take a Bow"
 Stephen Street – drum machine on "I Started Something I Couldn't Finish" and synthesized string arrangements on "Girlfriend in a Coma"

Production

 John Porter – producer (1, 3–4, 6–9, 14, 19), remixer (12)
 The Smiths – producers (12, 15, 20)
 Morrissey and Marr – producers (2, 5, 10, 13, 16)
 Johnny Marr – producer (21)
 Johnny Marr, Morrissey and Stephen Street – producers (11, 17–18, 22–23)
 Steve Lillywhite – remixer (4)

Charts

Certifications

References

The Smiths compilation albums
Albums produced by Stephen Street
2001 greatest hits albums
Albums produced by Roger Pusey
Albums produced by Dale Griffin
Albums produced by John Porter (musician)